Arago is a lunar impact crater located in the western part of the Mare Tranquillitatis. It was named after French astronomer François Arago in 1935. Its diameter is 26 km. To the southwest lies the crater Manners, and beyond are Dionysius and the Ritter–Sabine crater pair. To the southeast is the large Lamont formation that has been submerged by the mare.

The rim of Arago has a bulge in the western wall. There is a central ridge that runs towards the northern wall. The surface of the mare nearby is marked by wrinkle ridges, most notably to the east and southeast. To the north is a large lunar dome designated Arago Alpha (α). A similar-sized lunar dome is located an equal distance to the west, designated Arago Beta (β).

Satellite craters
By convention these features are identified on lunar maps by placing the letter on the side of the crater midpoint that is closest to Arago.

References

External links

 Lunar Orbiter 2 frame 57, showing Arago C in high resolution
 
 

Impact craters on the Moon